Dobrá may refer to:

Dobrá (Frýdek-Místek District), a municipality and village in the Moravian-Silesian Region, Czech Republic
Dobrá, Trebišov District, a municipality and village in the Košice Region, Slovakia
Simona Dobrá, Czech tennis player

See also
 Dobra (disambiguation)
 Döbra (disambiguation)